A Musical Massacre is the third studio album by American hip hop duo The Beatnuts. It was released in August 1999 via Loud Records. Recording sessions took place at Chung King Studios, Soho Music Studios and Planet Sound Studios in New York. Produced entirely by the Beatnuts, it features guest appearances from E-Swinga, Nogoodus, Biz Markie, Carl Thomas, Cheryl Pepsii Riley, Common, Cuban Link, dead prez, Greg Nice, Magic Juan, Marlon Manson, Patrick Blazy, Tony Touch, Triple Seis, Tyler Fernandez and Willie Stubz. The album peaked at number 35 on the Billboard 200 and number 10 on the Top R&B/Hip-Hop Albums in the United States. It contains two singles: "Watch Out Now", which peaked at number 84 on the US Billboard Hot 100, and "Se Acabo".

Critical reception
Del F. Cowie of Exclaim! thought that "revenge fantasies and mic bravado only go so far from two average MCs". Nathan Rabin of The A.V. Club wrote: "Encompassing everything from Marvin Gaye quotations to circus organs to old-school, Too $hort-style drum patterns, the members of The Beatnuts flex their production muscles throughout A Musical Massacre". AllMusic's M.F. DiBella called A Musical Massacre "among 1999's most entertaining hip-hop albums".

Track listing

Sample credits
Track 2 contains elements from "Giving Up" written by Danny Wolfe and performed by Zulema and "I Got The" written and performed by Labi Siffre
Track 5 contains elements from "Live at the Barbeque" written by Shawn McKenzie, Kevin McKenzie & William Paul Mitchell and performed by Main Source
Track 9 contains elements from "Braggin' & Boastin'" written by Nathaniel Hall & Michael Small and performed by The Jungle Bros.
Track 11 contains elements from "Under the Influence of Love" written by Barry Eugene Carter & Paul Politi and performed by Barry White
Track 16 contains elements from "Hi-Jack" written by Fernando Arbex

Personnel

Lester "Psycho Les" Fernandez – vocals, producer, executive producer
Jerry "JuJu" Tineo – vocals, producer, executive producer
Sammy "Triple Seis" Garcia – vocals (track 2)
Marlon "Perro" Manson – vocals (track 2)
William "Willie Stubz" Lora – vocals (track 3)
E. "Swinger" Pimentel – vocals (tracks: 3, 19)
Felix "Cuban Link" Delgado – vocals (track 5)
Lonnie "Common" Lynn – vocals (track 5)
Clayton "stic.man" Gavin – vocals (track 7)
Lavonne "M-1" Alford – vocals (track 7)
Cheryl Pepsii Riley – additional vocals (track 4), vocals (track 7)
Joseph "Tony Touch" Hernandez – vocals (track 8)
Ariel Harris – additional vocals (track 11)
Asjai Crutchfield – additional vocals (track 11)
Lindsay Robinson – additional vocals (track 11)
Gregory "Greg Nice" Mays – vocals (track 12)
G. "Gab Goblin" Mendez – vocals (tracks: 13, 18)
Tru Life of Nogoodus – vocals (track 13)
Patrick Blazy – vocals (track 15)
Marcel "Biz Markie" Hall – vocals (track 17)
Tyler Fernandez – vocals (track 17)
Carl Thomas – vocals (track 18)
John "Magic Juan" Wilson – vocals (track 19)
M. "G-Wise" Herald – beatboxing (track 18)
Chris Conway – recording (track 2), mixing (tracks: 2, 3, 5, 9, 11, 12, 16-19)
Alex Kyriazis – drums (track 9), recording (tracks: 3-5, 7, 9, 11, 12, 15-19)
Joe Quinde – mixing (tracks: 4, 7, 15)
Steve Stabile – recording (tracks: 11, 12)
Chris Gehringer – mastering
Carlos A. Pimentel – executive producer
Chiu Liu – art direction, design, photography
Piotr Sikora – photography
Michael Sarsfield – lacquer cut
Luxie Aquino – A&R

Charts

References

External links

1999 albums
Loud Records albums
The Beatnuts albums
Albums produced by the Beatnuts
Albums recorded at Chung King Studios